David DeFazio (born July 19, 1983 in Red Bank, New Jersey, U.S.) is an American-born ice dancer, who represented Switzerland in international competition. He previously represented Canada. He competed with Laura Csumrik and Ariane Morin, both representing Canada. He teamed up with Switzerland's Nora von Bergen in 2006. Von Bergen and DeFazio are the 2007 Swiss national champions. They split up after the 2007 European Championships. He went on to compete internationally representing Switzerland with Solene Pasztory and retired from competition in 2009.

DeFazio holds a master's degree in Sustainable Peace through Sport from the International University of Monaco and the United Nations-mandated University for Peace. He teaches figure skating and ice dance in Upstate New York.

External links
 
 David DeFazio and Rebekah Roulier publish do the good® for all: Mainstreaming Trauma-Sensitive Sport Interventions http://www.sportanddev.org/en/connect/userprofile.cfm?5518/do-the-good-for-all-Mainstreaming-Trauma-Sensitive-Sport-Interventions
 David DeFazio and Rebekah Roulier "Do the Good" Curriculum Project - EYSF2012 PINK PAPER COLLECTION OF PRACTICES. The European Youth and Sport Forum 2012: a bridge between projects and generations. http://www.isca-web.org/files/eysf/EYSF_2012/EYSF2012_collection_of_best_practices.pdf
 The Skating Collaborative http://www.theskatingcollaborative.com

Living people
1983 births
American male ice dancers
Canadian male ice dancers
People from Red Bank, New Jersey
Swiss male ice dancers